St Margaret and the Dragon may refer to:

 St Margaret and the Dragon (Raphael)
 St Margaret and the Dragon (Titian)